Gregory Lewis Stokes (born August 5, 1963) is a retired American professional basketball player who was selected by the Philadelphia 76ers in the second round (33rd pick overall) of the 1985 NBA draft. A 6'10" forward-center from the University of Iowa, Stokes played in 2 NBA seasons for the 76ers and Sacramento Kings. In his NBA career, Stokes played in 42 games and scored a total of 130 points. He played at Hamilton High School in Hamilton, Ohio in 1980-1981 and help lead team to a 25-1 record and regional finals appearance. He also played professionally in Italy and Australia. His daughter Kiah Stokes played college basketball at the University of Connecticut from 2011–2015. Kiah currently plays professionally in the WNBA for the Las Vegas Aces, and previously played for the New York Liberty.

References

External links
Assistant Coach - Greg Stokes
Greg Stokes - Hawkeye Sports News

Italian League statistics 

1963 births
Living people
African-American basketball players
American expatriate basketball people in Australia
American expatriate basketball people in Italy
American expatriate basketball people in Spain
American men's basketball players
Basketball players at the 1983 Pan American Games
Basketball players from New Haven, Connecticut
Centers (basketball)
Iowa Hawkeyes men's basketball players
Joventut Badalona players
Liga ACB players
Pallacanestro Cantù players
Pan American Games gold medalists for the United States
Pan American Games medalists in basketball
Parade High School All-Americans (boys' basketball)
Philadelphia 76ers draft picks
Philadelphia 76ers players
Power forwards (basketball)
Sacramento Kings players
Scaligera Basket Verona players
Sioux Falls Skyforce (CBA) players
Virtus Bologna players
Medalists at the 1983 Pan American Games
21st-century African-American people
20th-century African-American sportspeople